Eric Solorio Academy High School is a public 4-year high school located in the Gage Park neighborhood on the Southwest side of Chicago, IL. Solorio is part of the Chicago Public Schools district and is managed by the Academy for Urban School Leadership (AUSL).

History
Eric Solorio Academy High School was named after Chicago Police Officer Eric Solorio, who died of injuries and suffered in a car accident while on patrol in 2006. Officer Solorio was raised in the southwest side of Chicago and was on-track to graduate from Loyola University Chicago with a degree in Spanish (awarded posthumously). Solorio Academy High School opened in 2010 due to rapid growth in the student population of the Southwest side. Solorio Academy was ranked as one of the top 20 public high schools in Chicago.

The building is “Gold” level certified under the U.S. Green Building Council's Leadership in Energy and Environmental Design schools’ rating system, and includes a green roof covering 40 percent of the building. It was the first to implement CPS's Urban Model High School (UMHS) design and was part of the Modern Schools Across Chicago (MSAC) program.  The building contains more than 200,000 square feet and includes science, computer, visual and performing arts classrooms, as well as a library, a gymnasium, a swimming pool and playing fields and tennis courts. The school opened with grade 9 and has added a grade each school year. In June 2014, Solorio celebrated its first graduating class. In 2019, composer,producer, and alumn, MG Ricio, published the schoolsong ¨Warriors¨.

Academics
Solorio offers a college preparatory curriculum, including an Advanced Placement Courses in English Language, English Literature, Environmental Science, Human Geography, US History, Psychology, Spanish Language, Spanish Literature, Biology, Physics, Calculus, Statistics, and Art. In addition to core content, each department offers a variety of electives. Solorio also was designated "Strong" in the Creative Schools Certification program.

In 2014, Solorio's ACT Composite average score was 18.9. Their 4-year cohort graduation rate was 89.2%, and their culture and climate was deemed "Well Organized" according to the results of the My School, My Voice 5 Essentials survey from the University of Chicago Consortium on Chicago School Research.

Athletics
The boys' soccer team earned its first school's state championship with a 6-0 victory against Gibault Catholic High School in the 2017 IHSA 2A state championship.

Boys
Baseball
Basketball
Bowling
Cross Country
Football
Lacrosse
Soccer
Swimming
Tennis
Track & Field
Volleyball
Water Polo
Wrestling

Girls
Basketball
Bowling
Cheerleading
Cross Country
Lacrosse
Pom Pom
Soccer
Softball
16" Softball
Swimming
Tennis
Track & Field
Volleyball
Water Polo

Clubs and activities

After School Matters
Anime Club
Bowling
Chess Club
Chicago Cares
Choir
ComEd Youth Ambassadors
Cooking Club
Dance Team
Debate
DREAM Team
Gay-Straight Alliance (GSA)
Genesys Works
Graphic Design
Greencorps
Green Team
Guitar Club
Jazz Ensemble
Kpop Club
Marching Band
Math Team
National Honor Society
Robotics
Student Council
Student Newspaper
Tennis
Yearbook
Washington Fellows
WOW (Working On Womenhood)
ZeroWaste

References

External links 
 
 Solorio Athletics Webpage

Educational institutions established in 2010
Public high schools in Chicago
2010 establishments in Illinois